Decision at Gettysburg is a 1990 video game published by Tiglon Software.

Gameplay
Decision at Gettysburg is a game in which a strategic simulation involves the battle of the American Civil War.

Reception
M. Evan Brooks reviewed the game for Computer Gaming World, and stated that "Decision At Gettysburg is the first product from a new company. It attempted to do much and has actually achieved some of its objectives. The fact remains that it is currently cumbersome and awkward. However, its designers have shown a willingness to correct many of the deficiencies and, when this is done, DAG may well be one of the best operational computer wargames released."

References

1990 video games